This is a list of airlines currently operating in Moldova.

Scheduled airlines

Charter airlines

Cargo airlines

See also
 List of defunct airlines of Moldova
 List of airlines
 List of defunct airlines of Europe

References

Moldova
Airlines
Airlines
Moldova